The 2017–18 Danish 2nd Divisions will be divided in three groups of eight teams in the autumn. In spring there will be a promotion play-off and a relegation play-off. The top two teams of the promotion play-off group will be promoted to the 2018–19 Danish 1st Division.

Participants

Group 1

League table

Group 2

League table

Group 3

League table

Promotion Group
The top 4 teams from each group will compete for 2 spots in the 2018–19 Danish 1st Division. The points and goals that the teams won in the autumn group against other participants in the promotion group was transferred to the promotion group.

Relegation Group
The bottom 4 teams from each group will compete to avoid the 4 relegations spots to the Denmark Series. The points and goals that the teams won in the autumn group against other participants in the relegation group was transferred to the relegation group.

References

3
Danish 2nd Divisions
Danish 2nd Division seasons
2017–18 in Danish football leagues